

Legislative Assembly elections

Andhra Pradesh

Praja Rajyam was a regional political party in the state of Andhra Pradesh in India, founded by Telugu cinema actor Chiranjeevi on August 26, 2008.On 2011, 6 February it was officially announced that the party would be merging into Indian National Congress. As announced, it was formally merged with Indian National Congress in August 2011

Arunachal Pradesh

In a major political development, four Trinamool Congress (TMC) and five Nationalist Congress Party (NCP) legislators joined the ruling Congress on October 7, 2012, increasing its strength to 55 in the 60-member assembly. The four PPA MLAs had already switched over to the Congress on February 14, 2012. With this, the parties' positions in the assembly has changed to Congress 55 seats, BJP three seats, and TMC and Independents one seat each.

Haryana
In the Haryana assembly elections, 2009 Indian National Congress could not get majority.

In a 90 members Haryana assembly Congress won 40 seats, 5 short of simple majority.

In 2009 vidhan sabha elections, Haryana Janhit Congress (BL) emerged winner on following six seats. 
 Adampur - Kuldeep Bishnoi
 Assandh - Jile Ram
 Charkhi Dadri - Satpal Sangwan
 Hansi - Vinod Bhayana
 Narnaul - Rao Narender Singh
 Samalkha - Dharam Singh Chhokar

All 5 M.L.A from above list left Haryana Janhit Congress  and joined Indian National Congress with a merger, thus leaving Kuldeep Bishnoi as single legislator of the Party in Haryana Vidhan Sabha.

Thus the Indian National Congress achieved a simple majority.
Independents members also gave support to Indian National Congress to form stable government.

Jharkhand

Maharashtra

The Indian National Congress& the Nationalist Congress Party alliance, the Democratic Front or the Aghadi scored a decisive victory over the Mahayuti alliance of the Bharatiya Janata Party and the Shiv Sena. The Democratic front alliance secured 144 seats out of the possible 288. The Mahayutiended with a dismal 90 seats. The main reason for the dismal performance of the Mayavati alliance was the spoilsport played by the Maharashtra Navnirman Sena of Raj Thackeray. They split the Marathi votebank, a traditional stronghold of the Shivsena

Orissa

Sikkim

See also
Navin Chawla
N. Gopalaswami

References

External links

 Election Commission of India

2009 elections in India
India
2009 in India
Elections in India by year